Campbell River Water Aerodrome or Campbell River Harbour Airport, is located adjacent to Campbell River, British Columbia, Canada.

The airport is classified as an airport of entry by Nav Canada and is staffed by the Canada Border Services Agency. CBSA officers at this airport can handle general aviation aircraft only, with no more than 15 passengers.

Airlines and destinations

See also
 List of airports on Vancouver Island

References

Seaplane bases in British Columbia
Campbell River, British Columbia
Registered aerodromes in British Columbia